Berrys Coaches is a coach operator based in Taunton, Somerset. It was established in 1920 and is still a family owned business today.

Superfast coach services

Berrys started operating a service between Somerset and London following deregulation of the UK coach industry by the Transport Act 1980, . Today it operates five services under the 'Superfast' brand in each direction to and from Hammersmith bus station in London over three routes:
Superfast 1 - Tiverton, Wellington, Taunton, North Petherton, Bridgwater
Superfast 2 - Taunton, Ilminster, South Petherton, Yeovil, Ilchester, RNAS Yeovilton, Wincanton
Superfast 3 - Taunton, Street, Glastonbury, Wells, Shepton Mallet, Frome, Warminster, Codford, Amesbury
(The order of towns is shown here from Somerset towards London)

Other operations
Berrys Coaches run a programme of tours offering a variety of inclusive and coach-only day trips. They also operate home-to-school transport for Somerset County Council and other customers, as of 2021 transporting more than 1,600 students each school day. In 2022 began operating services from Plymouth to London under contract to FlixBus.
 
Its workshop and maintenance facilities were expanded to provide services to external to both other PSV operators and local HGV operators. These include vehicle inspection, repairs and maintenance and an ATF approved testing lane.

Berrys operated local services around Taunton in the 1990s under the Beaver Bus brand using Bristol VRT double-deck buses in competition with Southern National.

Fleet
Berrys operated a fleet of buses, coaches and executive minibuses for their own services and private hire work. These range from 16 to 78 seats.

After World war II the company operated a fleet based for a long time on Plaxton bodies and Bedford chassis. In the late 1980s, as they had preferred Volvo chassis, they began purchasing the first Van Hool bodied coaches, which still today form a large part of the Superfast and Executive fleet. The local school and tour fleet is based mainly on VDL Futura coaches.

References

External links

Bus operators in Somerset
Companies based in Taunton
Coach operators in England
Transport companies established in 1920
1920 establishments in England